Bob Ramsing (17 January 1923 – 16 January 1998) was a Danish screenwriter and film director. He wrote for 24 films between 1958 and 1992. He was born in Århus, Denmark.

Selected filmography
 Soldaterkammerater rykker ud (1959)
 Sømand i knibe (1960)
 Crazy Paradise (1962)
 Oskar (1962)
 Vi har det jo dejligt (1963)
 Bussen (1963)
 Sytten (1965)

External links

1923 births
1998 deaths
Danish male screenwriters
Danish film directors
People from Aarhus
20th-century screenwriters